The Annotated Chronicles is a fantasy omnibus novel by Tracy Hickman and Margaret Weis, set in the world of Dragonlance, and based on the Dungeons & Dragons game.

Plot summary
The Annotated Chronicles is a novel in which marginal notes are included from the authors including an omnibus volume of Dragons of Autumn Twilight, Dragons of Winter Night, and Dragons of Spring Dawning.

Reception

Reviews
Science Fiction Chronicle
Review by Gahan Wilson (2000) in Realms of Fantasy, February 2000

References

1999 American novels
Dragonlance novels